Ferdinand Laub (January 19, 1832March 17, 1875) was a Czech violinist and composer.

Life and career
Laub was born in Prague from a German Bohemian family which had assimilated into the ethnic Czech community. His father Erasmus (1794–1865) arranged for Ferdinand's first public appearance at age six. His first solo concert was at age ten in the Stavovské divadlo (a theater in Prague). From 1843 to 1846, he studied at the  Prague Conservatory. He began his adult career as a virtuoso in Vienna, at the imperial court. In 1850, he traveled across Europe with a series of exhibitions. He stayed for a longer time in Weimar and Berlin (1855–62 as professor at the Stern Conservatory). From 1866 to 1874 he was professor of violin at the Moscow Conservatory, where his many notable students included Stanisław Barcewicz.

Laub was a well-admired violinist, winning awards all over Europe; Pyotr Ilyich Tchaikovsky called him "the best violinist of our time".  He was the first violinist in the premiere performances of both Tchaikovsky's First and Second String Quartets, and the posthumous dedicatee of the Third of 1876. In January 1868, during Hector Berlioz's second trip to Moscow, Laub performed the solo viola part of his Harold en Italie at the Moscow Conservatory under the composer's baton.

In 1874, lung disease forced him to stop working. He was succeeded at Moscow Conservatory by Jan Hřímalý. He died on the way to a spa in Meran, in  near Bolzano, and is interred in the Vyšehrad cemetery.

His son Váša Laub (1857–1911) was also a violinist and composer.

Selected works

Concertante
 Cadenzas to Beethoven's Violin Concerto, Op. 61 (1859)
 Concerto in A minor for violin and orchestra; lost

Chamber music
 Élégie for violin and piano, Op. 3 (1857)
 6 Morceaux caractéristiques for violin and piano, Op. 4 (1858)
     Nocturne
     Ballade in A minor
     Romance
     Saltarello in D minor
      
      
 Rondo scherzoso for violin and piano or orchestra, Op. 6 (1859)
 2 Morceaux for violin and piano, Op. 7 (1861)
     Romance in A major
     Impromptu in G major
 Polonéza (Polonaise de concert) in G major for violin and piano, Op. 8 (1861) or violin and orchestra (1862)
 Velké brillantní duo na české národní písně for violin and piano (1865); co-composed with Guillaume Graf
 4 Morceaux for violin and piano, Op. 12 (published 1884)
     Canzonetta in B minor
     Bonheur perdu
     Romance sans paroles (Píseň beze slov; Song without Words; Lied ohne Worte) in B major
     Impromptu in A major
 Études de concert (3 Concert Etudes; 3 Concert-Etüden) for violin solo, Op. 13 (published 1881)
     Moderato in D minor
     Andante in C major
     Moderato vivace in E minor (Tarantelle aus der Stummen von Portici)
 3 Morceaux for viola (or violin) and piano, Op. 14 (published 1883)
 Adagio for violin and piano
 Holubice od Staňka for violin and piano
 String Quartet in C minor

Vocal

 České písně (Czech Songs; Böhmische Lieder) for voice and piano, Op. 2 (1857)
     Minka a včely (Das Minchen und die Bienen)
     Naděje (Hope; Hoffnung)
     Holubice (The Dove)
 3 Písně (3 Songs) for voice and piano, Op. 9 (1865)
     Pravdu mluv
     České písně
     Až mne nebude

References

External links
 Biography (in Czech)
 Details of Laub's life (in Czech)
 Biography at Tchaikovsky Research
 

1832 births
1875 deaths
Czech male classical composers
Czech classical violinists
Czech people of German descent
Academic staff of Moscow Conservatory
Musicians from Prague
Pupils of Simon Sechter
Czech Romantic composers
19th-century classical composers
19th-century classical violinists
Male classical violinists
19th-century Czech male musicians
Burials at Vyšehrad Cemetery